George Marion Jr. (August 30, 1899 – February 25, 1968) was an American screenwriter. He wrote for 106 films between 1920 and 1940. He also wrote lyrics for at least one Broadway musical revue: 1943's "Early To Bed" with music by Thomas "Fats" Waller. Collaborating with Karl Farkas, Marion wrote the libretto for Hungarian composer Emmerich Kálmán's 1945 operetta Marinka.

Marion was born in Boston, Massachusetts. He died in New York, New York from a heart attack.
 
His father was George F. Marion (1860-1945), a stage actor, stage director and film actor who is best remembered as Greta Garbo's father Chris in the early sound classic Anna Christie (1930). He was nominated at the 1st Academy Awards in the category of Best Title Writing, which was the only year it was presented.

In 1929, Marion and his wife were involved in the trial of an income-tax adviser. Both of them were witnesses in the trial of J. Marjorie Berger in U.S. District Court in Los Angeles. Marion testified that he signed his tax return without having read it. His wife testified that, at Berger's suggestion, she created two cash books that contained some fictitious entries and some true entries.

Selected filmography

 The Wedding Song (1925)
 Mantrap (1926)
 The Bat (1926)
 The Duchess of Buffalo (1926)
 Kid Boots (1926)
 Sweet Daddies (1926)
 Camille (1926)
 The Magic Flame (1927)
 A Little Journey (1927)
 Special Delivery (1927)
 It (1927)
 Wedding Bills (1927)
 Rough House Rosie (1927)
 Underworld (1927)
 One Woman to Another (1927)
 Two Arabian Knights (1927)
 Red Hair (1928)
 Manhattan Cocktail (1928)
 Warming Up (1928)
 Ladies of the Mob (1928)
 This Is Heaven (1929)
 The Mysterious Dr. Fu Manchu (1929)
 Follow Thru (1930)
 Love Me Tonight (1932)
 The Gay Divorcee (1934)
 The Music Goes 'Round (1936)
 You Can't Cheat an Honest Man (1939)

References

External links

1899 births
1968 deaths
American male screenwriters
Writers from Boston
Screenwriters from Massachusetts
20th-century American male writers
20th-century American screenwriters